East Alburgh (also known as East Alburg and Alburg Junction) is a populated place in Grand Isle County in the U.S. state of Vermont. It was formerly the location of the interchange between New England Central Railroad and Canadian National.

See also
Alburgh (town), Vermont
Alburgh (village), Vermont

References

Populated places in Grand Isle County, Vermont
Alburgh, Vermont